The Heartland League was an independent baseball league that operated from 1996 to 1998 in the central United States.

The Heartland League was founded with teams in Lafayette, Indiana; Anderson, Indiana; Will County, Illinois; and Dubois County, Indiana. Lafayette won the championship in 1996. In 1997, the Clarksville Coyotes, Tennessee Tomahawks, and Columbia Mules joined the league from the Big South League. The Altoona Rail Kings also joined the league from the North Atlantic League.  The four teams from the previous year remained, giving the league eight teams.  In 1997. the league drew over 210,000 fans, more than three times as many fans as in 1996.  The league fielded six teams in 1998, but teams in Huntington, West Virginia, and Booneville, Mississippi, suspended operations midway through the season and the league suspended operations after the Cook County Cheetahs jumped to the Frontier League.

The Mid-America League was based in Lafayette, Indiana, and was an independent baseball league located entirely within Indiana.  The Mid-America League was the same league as the Heartland League with a different name and the same franchise.  The Mid-America League operated in only four cities that were not served by Major or Minor League Baseball teams, and is not affiliated with either.

MAL Teams

Notes

References

See also
Independent baseball

Defunct independent baseball leagues in the United States
Defunct minor baseball leagues in the United States
Baseball leagues in Indiana
Sports leagues established in 1995
Sports leagues disestablished in 1998
1996 establishments in the United States
1998 disestablishments in the United States